The 1966 Football Championship of Ukrainian SSR (Class B) was the 36th season of association football competition of the Ukrainian SSR, which was part of the Ukrainian Class B. It was the sixteenth in the Soviet Class B and the fourth season of the Ukrainian Class B. 

The 1966 Football Championship of Ukrainian SSR (Class B) was won by FC Avanhard Zhovti Vody.

Zone 1

Location map

Relegated teams
 none

Promoted teams
 FC Avanhard Makiivka
 FC Start Dzerzhynsk – (champion of Donetsk Oblast)

Relocated and renamed teams
 SKCF Sevastopol was renamed from SKF Sevastopol
 FC Kryvbas Kryvyi Rih was renamed from FC Hirnyk Kryvyi Rih (not to be confused with another FC Hirnyk Kryvyi Rih)

Final standings

Zone 2

Location map

Relegated teams
 none

Promoted teams
 FC Torpedo Berdyansk
 FC Azovets Zhdanov

Relocated and renamed teams
 FC Chayka Sevastopol relocated from Balaklava (at that time a separate city)

Final standings

Post season playoffs (the season's final ranking)

See also
 Soviet Second League

External links
 1966 season regulations.  Luhansk football portal
 1966 Soviet championships (all leagues) at helmsoccer.narod.ru

1966
3
Soviet
Soviet
class B
Football Championship of the Ukrainian SSR